Mowry Slough is a  slough in Don Edwards San Francisco Bay National Wildlife Refuge and is the primary breeding ground for San Francisco Bay harbor seals. It is situated among the salt marshes and salt evaporation ponds in the city of Fremont.

See also

 List of watercourses in the San Francisco Bay Area
 Bair Island
 Greco Island

References

External links
 Map

San Francisco Bay
Don Edwards San Francisco Bay National Wildlife Refuge
Geography of Fremont, California
Landforms of Alameda County, California